Rugathodes is a genus of comb-footed spiders that was first described by Allan Frost Archer in 1950. It is closely related to members of Theridion and Wamba.

Species
 it contains eight species with a mostly paleotropical distribution:
Rugathodes acoreensis Wunderlich, 1992 – Azores
Rugathodes aurantius (Emerton, 1915) – North America, Russia (Europe to Far East), Kazakhstan
Rugathodes bellicosus (Simon, 1873) – Europe, Russia (Europe to South Siberia)
Rugathodes instabilis (O. Pickard-Cambridge, 1871) – Europe, Russia (Europe to West Siberia)
Rugathodes madeirensis Wunderlich, 1987 – Madeira
Rugathodes nigrolimbatus (Yaginuma, 1972) – Japan
Rugathodes pico (Merrett & Ashmole, 1989) – Azores
Rugathodes sexpunctatus (Emerton, 1882) (type) – USA, Canada, Russia (Commander Is.). Introduced to Britain

In synonymy:
R. lowriei (Barrows, 1945) = Rugathodes aurantius (Emerton, 1915)

See also
 List of Theridiidae species

References

External links
Rugathodes at BugGuide

Further reading

Araneomorphae genera
Spiders of Asia
Spiders of North America
Theridiidae